Danni McCormack (née Neilan; born March 15, 1990) is an Irish mixed martial artist (MMA), currently competing in the strawweight division of Invicta FC where she is the current Invicta FC Strawweight Champion. She also had a stint in Bellator.

Professional mixed martial arts career

Bellator
In her professional MMA debut, Neilan faced Camila Rivarola at Bellator 227 on September 27, 2019. She won the fight by unanimous decision.

Neilan faced Chiara Penco at Bellator 240 on 22 February 2020. She also won the fight by unanimous decision.

Neilan faced Claire Lopez at Bellator Milan 2 on 26 September 2020. She won the fight via a rear-naked choke submission in the second round.

Neilan faced Audrey Kerouche at Bellator 270 on 5 November 2021. She won the bout via third round technical knockout.

McCormack faced Stéphanie Page on 25 February 2022 at Bellator 275. She lost the bout via first round technical knockout, making it her first loss in her professional career.

Invicta FC 
McCormack faced Maíra Mazar on November 16, 2022, at Invicta FC 50, winning via unanimous decision.

McCormack faced Valesca Machado for the Invicta FC Strawweight Championship on March 15, 2023, at Invicta FC 52. She won the bout and title via unanimous decision.

Championships and accomplishments

Mixed martial arts 
 Invicta Fighting Championships
 Invicta FC Strawweight Championship (One time, current)

Mixed martial arts record

|-
|Win
|align=center| 7–2
|Valesca Machado
|Decision (unanimous)
|Invicta FC 52: Machado vs. McCormack
|
|align=center| 5
|align=center| 5:00
|Denver, Colorado, United States
|
|-
|Win
|align=center| 6–2
|Maíra Mazar
|Decision (unanimous)
|Invicta FC 50
|
|align=center| 3
|align=center| 5:00
|Denver, Colorado, United States 
|
|-
|Loss
|align=center| 5–2
|Manuela Marconetto
|Decision (split)
|CFC Malta 2
|
|align=center| 3
|align=center| 5:00
|Fort Saint Elmo, Malta
|
|-
|Loss
|align=center| 5–1
|Stéphanie Page
|TKO (punches)
|Bellator 275
|
|align=center| 1
|align=center| 1:46
|Dublin, Ireland
|
|-
|Win
|align=center| 5–0
|Audrey Kerouche
|TKO (punches)
|Bellator 270
|
|align=center| 3
|align=center| 3:58
|Dublin, Ireland
|
|-
|Win
|align=center| 4–0
|Katharina Dalisda
|Decision (unanimous)
|National Fighting Championship 4
|
|align=center| 3
|align=center| 5:00
|Bonn, Germany 
|
|-
|Win
|align=center| 3–0
|Claire Lopez
|Submission (rear-naked choke)
|Bellator Milan 2
|
|align=center| 2
|align=center| 3:45
|Milan, Italy
|
|-
|Win
|align=center| 2–0
|Chiara Penco
|Decision (unanimous)
|Bellator 240
|
|align=center| 3
|align=center| 5:00
|Dublin, Ireland
|
|-
|Win
|align=center| 1–0
|Camila Rivarola
|Decision (unanimous)
|Bellator 227
|
|align=center| 3
|align=center| 5:00
|Dublin, Ireland 
|

References

External links
 

1990 births
Living people
Sportspeople from County Roscommon
Strawweight mixed martial artists
Irish female mixed martial artists